William Cronjager was an American cinematographer who worked primarily in the television medium. The son, nephew and grandson of famous cinematographers, he began his career as an assistant cameraman, assisting on the 1957 film Oh, Men! Oh, Women!. In the 1960s he moved to the small screen, where he did the bulk of his work over the next two decades, beginning as the director of photography (DP) for the final three seasons (1967-1969) of the television melodrama, Peyton Place. While working as the DP for the first two seasons of the hit television drama Hill Street Blues, he won an Emmy for the premiere episode, "Hill Street Station".

Early life
Cronjager was born on March 28, 1930, in Queens, New York. He came from a long line of famous cinematographers: His father was Henry Cronjager Jr, who like his son worked primarily in the television industry; his uncle was the 7-time Oscar-nominated Edward Cronjager; his great-uncle was Jules Cronjager, who was the cinematographer on over 100 films from the mid-1910s through the early 1930s; and his grandfather was Henry Cronjager, a pioneering cinematographer who was known for his use of shadows, which would become a staple of the later German expressionist film movement.

Career
Cronjager began working in film in the late 1950s. Working as an assistant cameraman or 2nd assistant cameraman, he began on the 1957 comedy, Oh, Men! Oh, Women!. He also worked on the notable films, South Pacific (1958), The Hustler (1961), and Rio Conchos (1964). Beginning with taking over the photography on Peyton Place in 1967, he would work consistently in television through his retirement in 1988. Following Peyton Place, he would move to Bracken's World in 1969, staying with that series until it ended in 1970.

During the 1970s and 1980s, Cronjager was the original director of photography on the television series Columbo and Hart to Hart. He also continued to work on the big screen during this decade. In 1974 he was the cinematographer on the Charles Martin low-budget comedy, How to Seduce a Woman. His only other, and final, work on the big screen was on another low budget picture, 1976's Vigilante Force. During the 1970s, he worked on several notable television series. He took over the camera helm for the second series of the western, Alias Smith and Jones in 1971, and was frequent DP on Columbo.

In 1980, Cronjager was selected as the director of photography for the new police drama, Hill Street Blues. For the initial episode, titled "Hill Street Station", Cronjager chose to shoot approximately 90% of the show utilizing hand-held cameras. His work garnered him a Primetime Emmy, for Outstanding Cinematography in a Series.

Even though Cronjager had no involvement in the original Cannon television series from 1971 to 1976, when the series was resurrected in 1980 as a television film, the film's director, Corey Allen, selected Cronjager to shoot the picture. The TV film was titled The Return of Frank Cannon, and Allen was impressed with Cronjager's work on Hill Street Blues. For one scene in the film, it was necessary to light a six-acre set for a nighttime shoot. It took Cronjager and his crew seven and a half hours setting up the scene's lighting, which took up 6000 feet of cable and used about 3,000 amps. In the final product, the scene took up approximately 5 seconds of air time.

Cronjager's last project was the 1988 television film, Broken Angel (tv film), starring William Shatner and Susan Blakely.

Filmography

References

External links
 

1930 births
1995 deaths
American cinematographers